Reuland is a village in the commune of Heffingen, in central Luxembourg.  , the village has a population of 188.

Mersch (canton)
Villages in Luxembourg